Troutbeck is a village and former civil parish, now in the parish of Lakes, in South Lakeland district in Cumbria, England. It is a conservation area and includes the National Trust property of Townend. In 1961 the parish had a population of 592.

Village amenities
 Post Office, General Store and Teashop (on main road through village)
 Village Institute (above Post Office)
 The Mortal Man Inn (on main road through village). Has the "Oh, Mortal Man" verse on the pub sale, with reference to Sally Birkett's Ale:

 The Queen's Head Hotel (on A592, Kirkstone Pass Road)
 Jesus Church, with unusual Pre-Raphaelite stained glass
 Limefitt Caravan Park

History 
Troutbeck was formerly a township and chapelry in Windermere parish, from 1866 Troutbeck was a civil parish in its own right until it was abolished on 1 April 1974 to form Lakes.

References

External links

 Cumbria County History Trust: Troutbeck (nb: provisional research only – see Talk page)
Troutbeck page in The Cumbria directory
Troutbeck Village Association Community Site

Villages in Cumbria
Former civil parishes in Cumbria
South Lakeland District